Handzlówka  is a village in the administrative district of Gmina Łańcut, within Łańcut County, Subcarpathian Voivodeship, in south-eastern Poland.

The village has an approximate population of 1,500.

See also
 Walddeutsche

References

Villages in Łańcut County